The Val Vallis Award is an Australian poetry award named in honour of the Queensland poet Val Vallis (1916–2009). Val Vallis was a lyric poet who lectured in English and Philosophy at the University of Queensland. In 2002 the then Arts Minister, Matt Foley, announced "...the naming of a major poetry award, the first Arts Queensland Val Vallis Award for Unpublished Poetry to commemorate Val’s contribution to poetry in Queensland."

Bronwyn Lea the former poetry editor of University of Queensland Press then "designed and implemented the award" in 2003 and it today it is administered and managed by Queensland Poetry Festival (QPF) on behalf of Arts Queensland.

Entry to the Val Vallis 
Entry can be submitted from Australia wide as part of Queensland Poetry Festival's annual Poetry Awards. Submissions usually open in May/June each year.

Arts Queensland Val Vallis Award currently offers $2000 in total prizes for an unpublished poem or suite of poems for Australian emerging poets including the winner and r/up as well as support from Queensland Writers Centre. The prize is managed by and presented as a part of the Queensland Poetry Festival.

Winners 
2003 Jaya Savige

2004 Judy Johnson

2005 Ynes Sanz, Quandamooka Suite

2006 Nathan Shepherdson, The easiest way to open a door is to turn the handle

2007 Andrew Slattery, Frameworkers

2008 Anna Krien

2009 Andrew Slattery

2010 Michelle Cahill

2011 Rachael Briggs, Tough Luck

2012 Chloe Wilson, Not Fox Nor Axe

2013 B.R. Dionysius, Protein Gradients

2014 Chloe Wilson, The Heads of Holofernes (judges Judith Beveridge, Sarah Holland-Batt, Kent MacCarter) 

2015 Andrew Last, Precedent (judges Melinda Smith and Michael Farrell)

2016 Caitlin Maling, Conversion (judges Robert Sullivan and Chloe Wilson)

2017 Bronwyn Lovell, Quietly, on the way to Mars (judges Michelle Cahill and Stuart Barnes)

2018 Zenobia Frost, Reality On-Demand (judges Alison Whittaker and Angela Gardner)

2019 Damen O’Brien, Ice and Glass (judges Tamryn Bennett, Judith Beveridge, Yvette Holt)

2020 Helen Lucas, Heirloom (judges Felicity Plunkett and Samuel Wagan Watson)

2021 Dimitra Harvey, Cicadas (judges Sara M Saleh and Andy Jackson)

2022 Dan Hogan, Aduantas (judges Lucy Van and Damen O'Brien)

External links
 Queensland Poetry Festival official site

References

Australian poetry awards
Awards established in 2003